As the Second World War drew to a close, the Royal Canadian Navy (RCN) stopped its rapid expansion and dramatically reduced military expenditures. This resulted in a significant reduction in personnel and ships by 1947. With the emergence of the Cold War and the formation of the North Atlantic Treaty Organization, followed by the outbreak of the Korean War, the Canadian government increased military spending. The RCN recommissioned and modified Second World War ships held in reserve, launched new classes of ships, and upgraded its aviation capabilities. The List of Royal Canadian Navy ships of the Cold War lists the surface warships, submarines and auxiliary vessels in service from the Korean War through to 1991. It includes all commissioned, non-commissioned, loaned or hired ships. and all ships crewed by RCN personnel under the command of the RCN.

Surface vessels

Aircraft carriers

 (Majestic class)
 (Colossus class)

Light cruisers
 (later renamed )


Destroyers


 (Iroquois class)
 (Iroquois class)
 (Iroquois class)
 (Cr class)
 (Cr class)
 (E class)

 (Tribal class)
 (Tribal class)
 (Tribal class)
 (Tribal class)
 (Tribal class)
 (Tribal class)
 (V class)
 (V class)

Destroyer escorts

 (II)
 (II)
 
 (II)

 (II)
 (II)
 (II)
 (II)
 (II)
 (II)
 (II)

 (II)
 (II)
 (II)
 (III)
 (II)
 (II)
 (II)

Frigates



Minesweepers

 (I)
 (II)
 (II)
 (III)
 (II)
 (II)
 (III)

 (II)
 (III)
 (II)

 (II)
 (III)
 (II)

 (II)
 (III)

 (II)

 (Algerine class)
 (Algerine class)
 (Algerine class)
 (Algerine class)
 (Algerine class)
 (Algerine class)

 (Bangor class)
 (Bangor class)
 (Bangor class)

Patrol vessels

 (Detachment class)
 (II)
 (II)
 (Bird class)
 (Bird)
 (I) (Bird)
 (Bird)
 (Bird)
 (Bird)
 (Bird)
 (Bird)
 (Racer class)
 (Racer)

Submarines
 (II) 


 (II)

Auxiliaries

Auxiliary minesweeping
 (II)
 (III)


Diving support ship
 (II)

Escort maintenance ships


Fireboats
 (YTR 561)
 (YTR 562)

Gate vessels


High Speed Launch vessels
HSL-208 (ex-RCMP M208)
HSL-231 (ex-RCMP M231)
HSL-232 (ex-RCMP M232)
HSL-233 (ex-RCMP M233)
HSL-234 (ex-RCMP M234)
HSL-235 (ex-RCMP M235)

Hydrofoil prototype
 , ex- (I)
 (II)

Icebreaker


Replenishment ships




 (Dun class)

Research vessel
  (ex-HMCS Laymore)
  (ex-HMCS Whitethroat)

Survey ships
 (AGOR 114)


CFAV Quest (AGOR 172)

Training vessels
 (PTC 706, ex-ML Q106) (II)

Tugboats
 (Glen class 1975)

  (Ville class)

  (Saint class)

 CNAV Glendyne
 CNAV Glenlivet

Utility and other boats
CFAV Albatross (YAG 661)
CFAV Badger (YAG 319)
CFAV Blackduck (YAG 660)
CFAV Caribou (YAG 314)
CFAV Gemini (YAG 650)
CFAV Grizzly (YAG 306)
CFAV Lynx (YAG 320)
CFAV Pegasus (YAG 651)
CFAV Pelican (YAG 4)
CFAV Otter (YAG 312)
CFAV Wolf (YAG 308)

Yard diving tenders
CFAV Granby (YDT 12)
CFAV Raccoon (YDT 10)
Unnamed (YDT 11)

Submarine non-operational
ex- – training ship
ex- – stripped for parts in UK

See also
 Royal Canadian Navy
 Origins of the Royal Canadian Navy
 History of the Royal Canadian Navy
  List of ships of the Royal Canadian Navy
 Hull classification symbol (Canada)
 Her Majesty's Canadian Ship
 List of aircraft of the Royal Canadian Navy
List of Royal Canadian Navy ships of the First World War
List of Royal Canadian Navy ships of the Second World War

References

Notes

Citations

Bibliography and further reading

 
 
 
 
 
 
 
 
 
 
 
 

 

Canadian Forces Maritime Command
Fleet of the Royal Canadian Navy
Lists of ships of Canada
Cold War
Cold War-related lists